Polymethylhydrosiloxane (PMHS) is a polymer with the general structure -(CH3(H)Si-O)-. It is used in organic chemistry as a mild and stable reducing agent easily transferring hydrides to metal centers and a number of other reducible functional groups. A variety of related materials are available under the following CAS registry numbers 9004-73-3, 16066-09-4, 63148-57-2, 178873-19-3. These include the tetramer ((MeSiHO)4), copolymers of dimethylsiloxane and methylhydrosiloxane, and trimethylsilyl terminated materials.

This material is prepared by the hydrolysis of monomethyldichlorosilane CAS#: 75-54-7:
n MeSiHCl2 + n H2O → (MeSiHO)n + 2n HCl
The related polymer polydimethylsiloxane (PDMS) is made similarly, but lacking Si-H bonds, it exhibits no reducing properties. Dimethyldichlorosilane CAS#: 75-78-5 is then used instead of monomethyldichlorosilane CAS#: 75-54-7.

Illustrative of its use, PMHS is used for in situ conversion of tributyltin oxide to tributyltin hydride:

 2"(MeSiH)" + (Bu3Sn)2O → "Me2Si2O" + 2 Bu3SnH

References

Further reading
Larson, G. L.; Fry, J. L., "Ionic and organometallic-catalyzed organosilane reductions", Organic Reactions 2008, 71, 1-737. 

Silicones
Reagents for organic chemistry
Siloxanes
Reducing agents